Colotis lais, the Kalahari orange tip, is a butterfly of the family Pieridae. It is found in southern Africa. The habitat consists of savanna.

The wingspan is 30–38 mm. The adults fly year-round. The larvae probably feed on Capparaceae species.

References

Butterflies described in 1876
lais
Butterflies of Africa
Taxa named by Arthur Gardiner Butler